VietJet Air flies to 17 domestic destinations and 23 scheduled international destinations from its operating bases in Tan Son Nhat International Airport in Ho Chi Minh City and Noi Bai International Airport in Hanoi. It also serves some additional international points as seasonal charters.

Destinations 

VietJet Air serves the following destinations:

References 

Lists of airline destinations